Nursing in the United Kingdom has a long history. The current form of nursing is often considered as beginning with Florence Nightingale who pioneered modern nursing.  Nightingale initiated formal schools of nursing in the United Kingdom in the late 19th and early 20th centuries. The role and perception of nursing has dramatically changed from that of a handmaiden to the doctor to professionals in their own right. There are over 500,000 nurses in the United Kingdom and they work in a variety of settings, such as hospitals, health centres, nursing homes, hospices, communities, and academia, with most working for the National Health Service (NHS). Nurses work across all demographics and requirements of the public: adults, children, mental health, and learning disability. Nurses work in a range of specialties from the broad areas of medicine, surgery, theatres, and investigative sciences such as imaging. Nurses also work in large areas of sub-specialities such as respiratory, diabetes, neurology, infectious diseases, liver, research, cardiac, and stoma. Nurses often work in multi-disciplinary teams but increasingly are found working independently.

To practise, all nurses and nursing associates in the United Kingdom must be registered with the Nursing and Midwifery Council (NMC).

History

Florence Nightingale

 Florence Nightingale is regarded as the founder of the modern nursing profession. There was no real hospital training school for nurses until one was established in Kaiserwerth, Germany, in 1846. There, Nightingale received the training that later enabled her to establish, at St Thomas' Hospital in London, the first school designed primarily to train nurses rather than to provide nursing service for the hospital.

In the Crimean War against Russia, Nightingale was appointed to oversee the introduction of female nurses into the military hospitals in Turkey. In November 1854, Nightingale arrived at the barrack hospital near Constantinople, with a party of 38 nurses. Initially the doctors did not want the nurses there and did not ask for their help, but within ten days fresh casualties arrived from the Battle of Inkermann and the nurses were fully stretched. When Nightingale returned from the Crimean War in August 1856, she hid herself away from the public's attention. For her contribution to Army statistics and comparative hospital statistics in 1860, Nightingale became the first woman to be elected a Fellow of the Statistical Society.

Betsi Cadwaladr 

Another nurse active in the  care of soldiers in the Crimean War was a Welsh nurse, Betsi Cadwaladr, who drastically reformed the hospital at Balaclava.

Regulation 
To practise lawfully as a registered nurse in the United Kingdom, the practitioner must hold a current and valid registration with the Nursing and Midwifery Council. The title "registered nurse" can only be granted to those holding such registration; this protected title is laid down in the Nurses, Midwives and Health Visitors Act 1997.

Nursing and Midwifery Council

The core function of the NMC is to establish and improve standards of nursing and midwifery care to protect the public. It achieves this by placing registered nurses on a register, which anyone can search. As of March 2022, there were 758,303 registered health care professionals on the NMC register. 

Its key tasks are to:
register all nurses, midwives and nursing associates
ensure that they are properly qualified and competent to work in the UK.
set the standards of training and conduct that nurses, midwives and nursing associates need to deliver high quality healthcare consistently throughout their careers.
set the standards for pre-registration nursing education
ensure that nurses, midwives and nursing associates keep their skills and knowledge up to date and uphold the standards of their professional code.
ensure that nurses, midwives and nursing associates are safe to practise by setting rules for their practice and supervision.
use fair processes to investigate allegations made against nurses, midwives and nursing associates who may not have followed the code.

The powers of the NMC are set out in the Nursing and Midwifery Order 2001.

Membership of the council comprises 6 lay and 6 registrant members appointed by the Privy Council, including at least one member from each of the four UK countries. The registrant members consist of nurses, midwives and nursing associates. The lay members currently include people with diplomatic, legal and business backgrounds.

Register

The NMC register is split into three main parts: Nurses, Midwives and Specialist Community Public Health Nurses (SCPHN). Within the registration it contains several "sub-parts" and qualifications e.g. sub part 1, sub part 2.

There are over 618,000 registered Nurses, Midwives and SCPHNs. Of these:
Over 53% are Adult Nurses.
Over 60% are under the age of 40.
11.9% of registrants are male (74,038).
There are between 113 – 137 registered male midwives, representing 0.6% of practising midwives.

Basics Requirement for Nursing in the United Kingdom
UKVI Aceadmics ILETS 7.0 for reading, listening, and speaking and 6.5 for writing or UKVI general ILETS 4.0 & OET Grade B.

Revalidation 
Revalidation is a new requirement for all NMC registered members to revalidate every three years in order to ensure their registration can be renewed. Revalidation will be introduced from April 2016. Revalidation replaces Prep.

Revalidation requirements 
 450 practice hours, or 900 if renewing as both a nurse and midwife
 35 hours of CPD including 20 hours of participatory learning
 Five pieces of practice-related feedback
 Five written reflective accounts
 Reflective discussion
 Health and character declaration
 Professional indemnity arrangement
 Confirmation

Code of  conduct 
A new NMC Code was introduced in March 2015, this replaced the 2008 NMC code. The NMC code presents the professional standards that nurses and midwives must uphold in order to be registered to practise in the UK.

Representation

Royal College of Nursing 
Many nurses are members of the Royal College of Nursing (RCN) which has over 400,000 members: nurses, midwives, students and healthcare assistants. The RCN has a dual role as both a Royal College and a trade union. This dual role was the subject of debate in 2013, and there was a vote on dividing the RCN to form two organisations. 99.4% of voters did not want to divide.

Unite the Union, Unison and GMB 
Other trade unions that represent healthcare workers are Unite the Union, UNISON and GMB.

Nursing organisations 
Royal College of Nursing is a membership organisation and trade union.

The Queen's Nursing Institute (QNI) is a registered charity, which until the 1960s trained district nurses.

Guild of Nursing – A newly formed body that aims to represent Nurses.

The Florence Nightingale Foundation supports nurses and midwives with scholarships.

The Cavell Nurses' Trust, formerly known as NurseAid, was set up in 1917 following the death of Edith Cavell.

Burdett Trust for Nursing – An independent charitable trust named after Sir Henry Burdett KCB

Nursing values

The 6Cs 
The 6Cs are Care, Compassion, Courage, Communication, Commitment and Competence.

The 6Cs began with the concept of 'Energise for Excellence for nurses, midwives and other care staff' which was begun by Jane Cummings and Katherine Fenton. Following the Francis report compassion within nursing was revisited and 'Compassion in Practice' became a key phrase which helped to introduce and formalise the idea of the 6Cs. The 6Cs were rolled out in December 2012.

#Hellomynameis 
Started by Kate Granger after an experience in hospital where a member of staff did not introduce themselves, the 'hello my name is...' campaign became part of the 6Cs which encourages staff to introduce themselves by name.

The campaign operates on Twitter using the hashtag #Hellomynameis.

Government publications on nursing 
There have been many government reports on nursing in the United Kingdom.

Committee on Nursing chaired by Asa Briggs (1972) 

Following the pay disputes and nurses' strikes in the 1970s which included over 90,000 nurses, the Briggs Committee was established. It reported in 1972 and recommended a number of changes to professional education. The focus was mostly on education and training but also included professional regulation. The report was accepted in 1974.

Front Line Care (2010) 
Front Line Care and the government's response were published in 2010. The Chair of the Commission was Ann Keen MP who trained as a nurse.

Shape of Caring Review (2015) 
The Shape of Caring Review (Raising the Bar) was published in March 2015.

Nursing publications and databases 
There are a number of nursing publications, journals, magazines and blogs published online and in print.

Database 
CINAHL – CINAHL (Cumulative Index to Nursing and Allied Health Literature) began in the 1940s and is now a prominent database used by nurses in nursing research

Journals 

 British Journal of Cardiac Nursing
 British Journal of Community Nursing

Magazines 
Nursing Times – online and printed nursing magazine

Nursing Standard – online and printed magazine

Scrubsmag – online Nurses magazine and community

PRN Magazine online Nurses magazine

Nursing workforce

Workforce planning 
In England, Health Education England  commission undergraduate and postgraduate education. This is an autonomous national body which works to "ensure that healthcare staff are recruited in the right numbers with the right values and behaviours to support the delivery of excellent healthcare and drive improvement". The number of commissioned places for nurses has varied year on year, as follows:

Adult nursing education places commissioned each year

Nursing demographics 

The majority of the nursing profession in the United Kingdom are women at around 90% of the total workforce.  In September 2017 out of the 690,000 registered nurses and midwives 518 were 71 or older and about 191,000 were over 51. 56% were based in hospitals, 8% in care homes and 18% in community and district nursing.

Nursing shortages 

More than a third of nurses in training fail to complete the training course, and this has been the case for more than a century.

In January 2016 the RCN stated that more than 10,000 nursing posts went unfilled in 2015. This represented a 3% increase year on year from 11% in 2013, 14% in 2014 and 17% in 2015 of all London nursing positions and 10% as an average nationwide. According to a BBC article the Department of Health said it did not recognise the figures.  The National Audit Office estimated that there was a shortfall of 7% in the supply of nurses. There was a 3% fall in total registered nursing numbers for 2016/17 and a 23% rise in de-registrations. There were 17,000 permanently unfilled nurse vacancies across the UK.  In 2019 clinical pharmacology, spinal injuries, paediatric surgery, neurosurgery and neurology were the worst affected specialities. They each had an average of less than 90% of their planned nurse staffing levels.

A shortage of school nurses could put children's lives at risk.  Fiona Smith of the RCN said, “Children with conditions such as asthma, epilepsy or allergies could experience a life-threatening emergency at any time.  Without the right training, guidance and support from school nursing services, teachers could be completely unprepared for this kind of situation - putting children’s lives at serious risk.  It is time the government wakes up and realises the hugely detrimental impact these cuts are having to our children and our society. School nursing is a critical service and it needs to be treated as such.”

In his response to the Francis Inquiry Jeremy Hunt set up a system where hospitals in England were required to publish each month the number of nurses employed on each ward. This led to an increase of about 13,500 ward nurses between 2013 and 2018. However it also led to a reduction in numbers of community nurses.

Migration
An Organisation for Economic Co-operation and Development survey in December 2015 showed that 21.7% of NHS nurses were born abroad, compared with 26.9% in Ireland, 9.8% in Italy, 14% in Germany and 5.9% in France. The UK was the highest exporter of nurses, with more than 50,000 British nurses working in other OECD nations. The Migration Advisory Committee produced a report in 2016 in which they heavily criticised the Department of Health, Health Education England and NHS trusts for not recognising obvious warning signs over a number of years, and "reluctantly" agreed to keep nursing on the list of shortage occupations.

An English language test is compulsory for all foreign nurses, even if they are from English-speaking countries.  The process of registering as a nurse can take up to a year and cost more than £3,000.

Nursing health

Campaigns 
There are regular health campaigns within nursing in the United Kingdom. These campaigns range from nationwide to ward-based.

Sign up to Safety – A national campaign/initiative to ensure staff coordinate their efforts and ideas around ensuring and enhancing safety.

NHS Change Day – NHS change day takes place on 11 March each year. It is designed to get all staff thinking and contributing ideas to improve the NHS.

Antibiotic Guardian – Gathers pledges to slow down antibiotic resistance, European Antibiotic Awareness Day (EAAD) is held on 18 November.

Nurses' health 
Nurses' health has been the subject of much discussion in reference to obesity and smoking. The effect of nursing on nurses' physical and mental health has also been a subject of a number of research papers where the effect of shift work or working with chemicals such as in chemotherapy has been explored. In 2016 the government announced £600 million was to be spent on "tackling obesity and improving the well-being of its 1.3 million staff".

Non-registered staff
Non-registered staff carry out a number of roles, often working in direct patient care (often on wards), performing tasks such as personal care (washing and dressing), social care (feeding, communicating to patients and generally spending time with them) and more specialised tasks such as recording observations or vital signs (such as temperature, pulse and respiratory rate, or TPR) or measuring and assessing blood pressure, urinalysis, blood glucose monitoring, pressure sores (see Waterlow score) and carrying out procedures such as catheterisation and cannulation).

Some unregistered staff can work in other roles, for example as phlebotomists (taking blood samples), ECG technicians (recording electrocardiograms) or smoking cessation therapists, a scheme currently being employed in a number of general practitioner surgeries. Others can expand their ward-based role to include these tasks and others. There are few areas of nursing practice that cannot be legally performed by suitably trained non-registered staff, although they cannot fully replace them, as they legally must be supervised (either directly or indirectly) by a fully qualified registered nurse.

In 2019 it was reported that less qualified support workers were increasingly covering shifts because of the national shortage of mental health nurses.

Healthcare Assistant 
Non-registered staff have various job titles such as "clinical support worker", "care assistant", "nursing assistant" and "healthcare assistant" (HCA). Typically they are on pay band 2 or 3, although senior healthcare assistants can be on band 4.

Nursing roles
Traditionally, on completion of training, nurses would be employed on a hospital ward, and work as staff nurses. The ward hierarchy consists of:
 Dental Nurses – works as part of a dental team in a variety of clinical and non-clinical settings. Dental Nurses attract a Band 4 salary but can move up to Band 5 in management roles.

 Nursing Associate – first grade of qualified nursing staff. Ben Gummer MP introduced the role of Nursing Associates, who would work alongside healthcare support workers and qualified nurses focusing on patient care. The Nursing and Midwifery Council announced in 2016 that it would professionally regulate the role (qualification code NAR). Nursing associates train in the four branches of nursing, following a FdSc apprenticeship programme. They deliver care in a wide range of settings; primary, secondary, community and social care. Their training will provide them with both clinical knowledge and skills. Nursing associates are able to administer some medicines without supervision. Under Agenda for Change they attract a Band 4 salary.

Staff Nurses/General Nurse/Staffer of Nursing – the second grade of qualified nursing staff. These nurses are responsible for a set group of patients (e.g. administering medications, assessing, venepuncture, wound care and other clinical duties). Under Agenda for Change they attract a Band 5 salary but sometimes a Band 6 salary.
Senior staff nurses/Staffer Manager – these nurses carry out many of the same tasks, but are more senior and more experienced than the staff nurses. Many NHS Trusts do not have Senior Staff Nurses as the role is seen to be superfluous.
Junior/Deputy Ward Sister; Charge Nurse; Deputy Ward Manager – responsible for the day-to-day running of the ward, and may also carry specific responsibilities for the overall running of the ward (e.g. rostering) in accordance with the wishes of the ward manager. These nurses are assigned band 6. In some NHS Trusts, these will be known as Sisters/Charge Nurses.
Ward Manager/Ward Sister/Charge Nurse/Nurse Manager/Clinical Ward Nurse Lead – responsible for running a ward or unit, and usually has budgetary control. They will employ staff, and be responsible for all the local management (e.g. rostering, approving pay claims, purchasing equipment, delegation duties or tasks). These nurses are band 7. They are generally Senior Staff Nurses or Charge Nurses as well.
Senior Ward Sister; Senior Charge Nurse; Senior Ward Manager – if there is a need to employ several nurses at a ward manager level (e.g. in A&E), then one of them often acts as the senior ward manager. These nurses attract a banding anywhere between 7 and 8c.

There are also positions which exist above the ward level:
 Clinical Nurse Manager/ Nurse Lead – A nurse who is responsible for an entire directorate/department (i.e. Surgical, Medical Diagnostic & Imaging etc.) or at least more than one ward, is often referred to as a clinical nurse manager. Depending on both the inclination of the NHS Trust and themselves, they may be more or less involved in actual clinical nursing or management on a clinical level. These nurses attract band 8a (or occasionally 8b/8c) under Agenda for Change.
 Modern Matrons/Nursing Director/Nurse Matron – developed in response to some patients' perception of the detachment of nursing from its vocational history, the modern matron is responsible for overseeing all nursing within a department or directorate. Modern matrons are employed on bands 8a-c. See Matron for more details of this role and its historical roots. Modern matrons were poorly received by the majority of nursing staff and their imposition was not called for by any professional group within the health service.
The status in the hierarchy of specialist nurses is variable, as each specialist nurse has a slightly different role within their respective NHS organisation. They are generally experienced nurses, however, and are employed at least on band 6.

Specialist nurses
There are increasing roles for specialist nurses who generally have many years of experience in their field, in addition to extra education and training. They can be split into several major groups:
 Nurse practitioners – These nurses carry out care at an advanced practice level. They often perform roles similar to those of doctors. They commonly work in primary care (e.g. GP surgeries) or A&E departments, although they are increasingly being seen in other areas of practice.
 Specialist Community Public Health Nurses – Traditionally known as District Nurses and Health Visitors, this group of practitioners now includes many school nurses and Occupational Health Nurses.
 Clinical Nurse Specialists – Those undertaking these roles commonly provide clinical leadership and education for the Staff Nurses working in their department, and will also have special skills and knowledge which ward nurses can draw upon.
 Nurse Consultants – These nurses are similar in many ways to the clinical nurse specialist, but at a higher level. These practitioners are responsible for clinical education and training of those in their department, and many also have active research and publication activities.
 Lecturer-Practitioners – These nurses work both in the NHS and in universities. They typically work for 2–3 days per week in each setting. In university, they may train pre-registration student nurses (see below), and often teach on specialist courses for post-registration nurses (e.g. a Lecturer-practitioner in critical care may teach a master's degree course in critical care nursing). Lecturer-Practitioners are now more often referred to by the more common job title of Practice Education Facilitators (shortened by student nurses to PEFs).
 Lecturers – These nurses are not employed by the NHS. Instead they work full-time in universities, both teaching and performing research. Typically lecturers in nursing are qualified to a minimum of a master's degree and some are also qualified to PhD level. Some senior lecturers also attain the title of Professor. This title is more often the School/Department Dean e.g. Dean/Vice Dean School of Health & Social Care.
 Managers – Many nurses who have worked in clinical settings for a long time choose to leave clinical nursing and join the ranks of the NHS and independent care sector management. This used to be seen as a natural career progression for those who had reached ward management positions; however with the advent of specialist nursing roles (see above), this has become a less attractive option. Nonetheless, many nurses fill positions in the senior management structure of NHS organisations and independent healthcare organisations, some even as board members or directors. Others choose to stay a little closer to their clinical roots by becoming regional managers, service managers, clinical nurse managers or Modern Matrons.

Nursing Assessment Tools

Initial Assessments and Observations 
ABCDE – Airway, Breathing, Circulation, Disability and Exposure

NEWS – National Early Warning Score

Holistic Assessments 
Activities of daily living –

Richmond Agitation Sedation Score (RASS)

CAM-ICU - Confusion Assessment Method for the ICU

Pain Assessments 
Wong Baker Faces –

PAINAD –

Critical Pain Observation Tool (CPOT)

General Assessment Tools 
Waterlow score –

MUST – Malnutrition Universal Screening Tool

Nurse education

Non-registered staff education
There is no mandatory training for most people undertaking non-registered staff roles such as a Healthcare Assistant. But the majority of NHS employers have developed "in-house" training for these members of staff, including both induction programmes and ongoing education to achieve a recognised qualification. Some collaborate with local further education colleges to provide theoretical input, and may award a recognised qualification. It is becoming more common for NHS employers to ask for some type of health or social care qualification for potential recruits: for example, an SVQ/NVQ or HNC/HND with various qualification names including health care, social care and health & social care.

Many trusts and health boards create opportunities for these staff members to become qualified nurses. This is known as secondment (whereby the trust/health board continues to pay them for the duration of their training, and often guarantees employment as qualified nurses following the completion of their training).

Pre-registration education
To become a registered nurse one must complete a nursing degree programme recognised by the Nursing and Midwifery Council from an approved provider i.e. universities offering these courses.

Education format
A nursing course is a 50/50 split of learning in university (lectures and examinations) and in practice (supervised patient care within a hospital or community setting). Nursing courses usually take three years and are 4,600 hours in length, which is split 50%/50% between theory and clinical placements as set out as a requirement of the NMC. Graduate courses are provided and are two years in length. Graduate courses often require prior learning and relevant healthcare experience; this can be referred to as APEL (Accreditation of Prior and Experiential Learning).

There are four different branches of nursing offered at university level (not including midwifery):

 Adult nursing
 Child nursing
 Mental health nursing
 Learning disabilities nursing

Nursing Diploma
State Enrolled Nurses (SENs) were formally recognised in the 1940s, and training took place in hospitals. Nursing education remained closely linked to the hospital where nurses were placed and often lived.

Project 2000; The Nursing degree
Project 2000 began in 1990 and was designed to move nursing education from hospitals into universities. Prior to Project 2000, nurse education was the responsibility of hospitals and was not based in universities; many nurses who qualified prior to these reforms do not hold an academic award.

From September 2013, all nurse training programmes must be at degree level, with no option to study instead for a diploma.

Midwifery education
Midwifery training is similar in length and structure, but is sufficiently different that it is not considered a branch of nursing. There are shortened (18-month) programmes to allow nurses already qualified in the adult branch to hold dual registration as a nurse and a midwife. Shortened courses lasting two years also exist for graduates of other disciplines to train as nurses. This is achieved by more intense study and a shortening of the common foundation programme.

NHS Student Bursary
Student nurses in England and Wales no longer receive a bursary from the government to support them during their nurse training. Diploma students in England receive a non-means-tested bursary of around £6,000 – £8,000 per year (with additional allowances for students with dependant children), whereas degree students have their bursary means tested (and often receive considerably less). Degree students are, however, eligible for a proportion of the government's student loan, unlike diploma students. But in Scotland and Wales, all student nurses (regardless of which course they are undertaking) receive the same bursary in line with the English diploma course. All student nurses in Wales study, initially, for a degree, but may choose to remain at Level 2 for their third year, thereby achieving a diploma rather than a degree.

It was announced in the Chancellor's Spending Review of November 2015 that from 2017 the NHS bursary would be removed for all future nursing, midwifery and allied health professionals. This would apply only to student nurses in England, with Welsh & Scottish students remaining unaffected.

Post-registration education

After the point of initial registration, there is an expectation that all qualified nurses will continue to update their skills and knowledge. The Nursing and Midwifery Council insists on a minimum of 35 hours of education every three years, as part of its post-registration education and practice (PREP) requirements.

There are also opportunities for many nurses to gain additional clinical skills after qualification. Cannulation, venepuncture, intravenous drug therapy and male catheterisation are the most common, although there are many others (such as Advanced Life Support) which some nurses will undertake.

Many nurses who qualified with a diploma can choose to upgrade their qualification to a degree by studying part-time. Many nurses prefer this option to gaining a degree initially, as there is often an opportunity to study in a specialist field as a part of this upgrading. In England, it is also much more financially lucrative, as diploma students get the full bursary during their initial training, and employers often pay for the degree course as well as the nurse's salary. However, from September 2013 onwards all students can only study at degree level, while diplomas are gradually being phased out permanently.

To become specialist nurses (such as nurse consultants, nurse practitioners, etc.) or nurse educators, some nurses undertake further training above bachelor's degree level. Master's degrees exist in various healthcare related topics, and some nurses choose to study for PhDs or other higher academic awards. District nurses and health visitors are also considered specialist nurses, and to become such they must undertake specialist training (often in the form of a top-up degree (see above) or post graduate diploma).

All newly qualified district nurses and health visitors are trained to prescribe from the Nurse Prescribers' Formulary, a list of medications and dressings typically useful to those carrying out these roles. Many of these (and other) nurses will also undertake training in independent and supplementary prescribing, which allowed them (as of 1 May 2006) to prescribe almost any drug in the British National Formulary. This was the cause of a great deal of debate in both medical and nursing circles.
However, as of 2012 there were over 25,000 Nurse Prescribers. Nurse Prescribing had become a mainstream role within nursing, accepted by not only healthcare professionals but also patients. After a historic change in legislation (which came into force in England on 23 April 2012) nurse prescribers may now prescribe exactly the same medicines as Doctors (including Controlled Drugs). A common set of prescribing competencies was published in May 2012 by the National Prescribing Centre for all prescribing professionals.

Overseas nurses 
The Nursing and Midwifery Council has a specific process for inducting Registered Nurses trained outside UK / EU. Prior to October 2016 an outside UK RN would have to undergo an Overseas Nursing Program known in short as the ONP. The ONP had to be undertaken by the candidate after NMC makes necessary checks and issue the candidate with a decision letter stating that the person may join a university to undertake the ONP. However, due to shortage of nurses and NMC striving for gold standards in nursing they have now updated their new process to a two part test of competence. The first part is called CBT and Part 2 (objective structured clinical examination (OSCE).  The process includes an English language test which has been criticised as discriminatory because it demands an academic standard of reading and writing that many native English speakers could not meet.  This means at least 3,000 qualified nurses from India who are already in the UK are not on the register, and so are paid less for similar work.

Protests

NHS Student protests #BursaryorBust
In the November 2015 spending review, George Osborne stated that he would remove the NHS Student Bursary from 2017. This prompted several Nursing students to organise a political demonstration with other healthcare students at King's College London outside the Department of Health in December 2015 which was attended by several hundred supporters. Kat Webb also decided to start a petition on the government's e-petition site, which received over 150,000 signatures

The student bursary debate has been raised in parliament at Prime Minister's Questions, and is the subject of the 'Early Day Motion (EDM) 1081 – THE NHS BURSARY', which was sponsored by Wes Streeting MP.

December 2015 – Department of Health 
In December 2015, several hundred people protested the recent removal of the NHS student bursary as announced in the November 2015 spending review.

January 2016 – Downing Street March 
Over 7000 NHS students and supporters marched on Downing Street in January 2016. The protest was attended by Shadow Health Minister Heidi Alexander MP, Wes Streeting MP, Natalie Bennett, Sian Berry, representatives of UNISON, Unite the Union and Royal College of Midwives. The hashtag #bursaryorbust was the top trending Twitter.

February 2016 – Placement walkout 
In February, NHS students walked out of placement in solidarity with the Junior Doctors strike.

Nursing research 
For the full article see also (Nursing research)

Nursing research is research that provides evidence used to support nursing practices. Nursing, as an evidence-based area of practice, has been developing since the time of Florence Nightingale to the present day, when many nurses now work as researchers based in universities as well as in the health care setting.

Nursing industrial action 
Whilst nurses are not known for striking or taking industrial action, there have been many occasions when nurses have gone on strike, often over pay and conditions. The Royal College of Nursing had a no-strike policy for 79 years until 1995, when the policy was dropped due to pay disputes at the time.

In 1939 rallied together as it was reported in the Daily Mirror that many nurses were leaving the role and were enduring financial hardship.

In 1948, following the establishment of the NHS, nurses realised that their pay had decreased, which led to strike action.

In 1962 many nurses marched to Trafalgar Square as part of pay disputes under the banner of "Empty Purses Mean Less Nurses".

In 1970 many nurses protested at pay and conditions.

In 1973 it was reported that over 7,000 nurses marched in Sheffield.

In 1974 several protests took place by nurses over pay and conditions.

In 1976 many nurses took part in a low pay strike.

In 1982 there was a National Health Service day of action with 120,000 workers marching at various locations around the country including many nurses.

In 1988 Nurses went on strike in 1988 over pay and proposed changes to the NHS.

In 2011 Unison nurses protested and marched over pay.

In 2014 Midwives and some nurses went on strike over pay.

In 2015 nursing students protested outside the Department of Health over the removal of the NHS student bursary.

In 2016 nursing students marched to Downing Street to protest over the removal of the NHS student bursary. The protest was attended by Shadow Health Minister Heidi Alexander MP, Wes Streeting MP, Representatives of UNISON, Unite the Union and Royal College of Midwives.

Nursing pay
Until October 2004, all nurses in the NHS were employed on a scale known as clinical grading (see below). Agenda for Change was developed by the NHS in response to criticisms that the old scale reflected length of service more than knowledge, responsibility and skills.

Clinical grading
This was known as the Whitley Council system. This placed nurses (and some other hospital staff) on "grades" between A and I (with A being the most junior, and I the most senior). Unregistered staff were employed on grades A and B (occasionally grade C). Second level nurses were employed on various grades (usually between C and E), with first level nurses taking up grades D-I.

Agenda for Change

This system puts registered staff on bands 5–8, unregistered staff such as Healthcare Assistants take up bands 2–4. Band 9 posts are for the most senior members of NHS management. Each band contains a number of pay points.

The idea of this system is "equal pay for work of equal value". There was a perceived discrepancy, under clinical grading, between ones grade (and therefore pay) and the work which one actually did, which Agenda for Change aimed to fix. Most NHS staff are now on the AfC system which took quite a long time to implement across the UK. A small percentage of staff went through an appeal procedure as they disagreed with the band that they have been placed on.

In 2015–16 the minimum starting salary for a registered nurse will be £21,692 in England, Wales while in Scotland it will be £21,818.  Northern Ireland have yet to announce their pay rates for 2015–16.

NHS Pay Review Body (NHSPRB) 
The NHS Pay Review Body is an independent body that makes recommendations to the government on the pay of nurses and NHS staff. The government then makes the final decision

In 2014 the government rejected the NHSPRB recommendation for a 1% pay rise.

In 2016 the government announced that nurses would receive a 1% pay rise which would take effect from 1 April 2016. The RCN Chief Executive Janet Davies stated that "The fact remains that pay awards for NHS staff have been severely constrained since 2010".

Pay disputes 
There have recently been complaints of Agenda for Change being a sexist system, as nurses, who are mostly female, claim that, as a profession, they are under-valued using this system. In 2015 the RCN stated that Nurses had suffered a drop in pay equivalent to 9.8% in real terms since 2008.

Agency Nurse Pay Cap 
In 2015 the government announced that there would be a gradual introduction of pay caps for agency nurses working under NHS England. Starting in November 2015, further caps came in February 2016 with the final cuts introduced in April 2016. The aim of the cap was to save £1bn over three years. The implications of the pay cap means that trusts will not be able to pay staff who work for an agency including doctors and nurses, more than 55% more for a shift than a permanent member of staff. Jeremy Hunt in his capacity as the Health Secretary said it would stop agencies "ripping off the NHS". In response a petition started on the government website which received over 10,000 responses.

Nurses finance situation 

In 2016, several publications appeared in the media, claiming nurses depend on food banks and payday loans to survive. In October 2016, Western Circle published research, claiming that the sector of NHS Nurses are heavily dependent on payday loan. According to the research, the number of nurses using payday loans has doubled in 3 years, since 2013. This research brought the matter of the low wages nurses received in the UK to the attention of media outlets. The claims were that nurses' salaries were frozen for more than 6 years and in some cases, resulted in financial distress, clearly as wages have not kept pace with the cost of living increases in this time. The lack of pay increases for, particularly nurses within the NHS continues to be an important topic of public discussion in the UK.

NHS pension 
The NHS pension is the main pension offered to NHS staff. There have been three distinct changes made to the NHS pension. The type of pension someone is enrolled onto is referred to by the year that it was introduced or changed 1995, 2008 & 2015.

Nursing in culture 

Whilst nursing has modernised significantly, the image of nursing can remain steadfastly considered as something akin to Hattie Jacques in a Carry on film such as Carry On Matron.

Mrs Gamp – Sarah or Sairey Gamp is a nurse in the novel Martin Chuzzlewit by Charles Dickens, first published as a serial in 1843–1844. Mrs. Gamp, as she is usually referred to, is dissolute, sloppy and generally drunk. She became a notorious stereotype of untrained and incompetent nurses of the early Victorian era, before the reforms of campaigners like Florence Nightingale. The caricature was popular with the British public.

Carry On Films – Carry On Nurse/ Carry On Matron, The Carry On franchise primarily consists of a sequence of 31 low-budget British comedy motion pictures (1958–92), four Christmas specials, a television series of thirteen episodes, and three West End and provincial stage plays. The films' humour was in the British comic tradition of the music hall and bawdy seaside postcards.

Casualty – A BBC series

24hrs in A&E – A British medical documentary set initially in King's College Hospital. In the 7th series, the setting was St George's Hospital. 91 cameras filmed round the clock for 28 days, 24 hours a day in A&E (Accident and Emergency) it offers unprecedented access to one of Britain's busiest A&E departments.

Getting On – Getting On is a satirical British sitcom based on a geriatric ward in an NHS hospital. It is written by its core cast, Jo Brand, Vicki Pepperdine, and Joanna Scanlan. Several episodes were directed by Peter Capaldi. It first aired in July 2009, for three episodes.

See also 

History of nursing in the United Kingdom
Queen Alexandra's Royal Army Nursing Corps

References 

 
Healthcare occupations in the United Kingdom